In Greek mythology, Beres son of Makednos, according to Theagenes (2nd century BC) in his Makedonika, who is quoted by Stephanus of Byzantium, and father of Mieza, Beroea and Olganos.

Note

References 
 Place-names in classical mythology: Greece,  Robert E. Bell
 A history of Macedonia, Volume 1, Nicholas Geoffrey Lemprière Hammond, Guy Thompson Griffith
 Classical philology, Volumes 49–50. JSTOR

Mythology of Macedonia (ancient kingdom)
Characters in Greek mythology